Hradiště is a municipality and village in Plzeň-South District in the Plzeň Region of the Czech Republic. It has about 200 inhabitants.

Administrative parts
Villages of Bezděkov and Zahorčičky are administrative parts of Hradiště.

References

Villages in Plzeň-South District